Hume's Fork is a satirical novel published in April 2007. It was written by Ron Cooper and published by Bancroft Press.

Summary 
Hume's Fork is a novel about a philosophy professor named Legare "Greazy" Hume. He attends a conference in Charleston, South Carolina, with his eccentric colleague Saul Grossman and has to stay, much to his annoyance, with his family. A professional wrestling tournament takes place in Charleston at the same time, and soon the wrestlers philosophize while the philosophers begin to act like wrestlers. Hume works through philosophical problems while facing his own identity crisis.

The title comes from a "Hume's fork", a distinction made by the 18th-century British philosopher David Hume while also referring to several personal choices that Legare Hume must make.

Reception 
This novel was well received by critics. The novelist and MacArthur Fellow Rebecca Goldstein called it a "mix of zaniness and erudition, satire and insight ... as delicious as it is original." The novelist Ron Rash said it "is one of the funniest novels I have read in a long time." The philosopher Robert Solomon said the "book reminded me of David Lodge's Small World: An Academic Romance, with a philosophical twist." The writer Katherine Ramsland described it as "Sideways meets Socrates".

References

External links 
 http://www.roncooper.org
 http://www.bancroftpress.com

2007 American novels
American philosophical novels
Novels set in South Carolina
American satirical novels
David Hume